A SOT-A (Special Operations Team-Alpha) is a signals intelligence–electronic warfare (SIGINT-EW) element of the United States Army Special Forces. They are low-level SIGINT collection teams that intercept and report operational and technical information derived from tactical threat communications through prescribed communications paths.  The mission of a SOT-A is to conduct SIGINT/EW in support of information operations (unilaterally or in conjunction with other Special Operations Forces (SOF) elements) to support existing and emerging SOF missions worldwide.

SOT-A's are the direct descendants of the Army Security Agency's Special Operations Detachments (USASASODs).

Capabilities
SOT-As can detect, monitor, and exploit threat communications through communications transmission intercept and direction finding. SOT-As also can deploy with Special Forces Operational Detachments-A (SFODAs or A-teams) to provide SIGINT support for contingency, direct action, force protection, or MTT support. These functions may require SOT-As to:
Deploy with a SFODA.
Deploy independently and then join a deployed SFODA.
Operate independently or with other SOT-As.
Operate and train on advanced collection equipment provided by national intelligence agencies.

Insertion/Extraction Techniques

Patrolling
Helicopter Touchdown, 
Helocast
Personnel
Small Boat
Rappel
Fast Rope
Special Patrol Insertion/Extraction (SPIE)
Parachute
Static-Line

SOT-A team members can operate in remote and denied areas. In addition to their linguistic and SIGINT skills, SOT-As are trained in tactical and fieldcraft techniques.

SIGINT (Signals Intelligence)

Foreign languages
Arabic
Chinese
Farsi
French
Indonesian
Korean
Russian
Spanish
Thai
Tagalog
Morse Code intercept (>20 GPM)
Analysis and reporting

Advanced training

Advanced training may include:
Survival Evasion Resistance Escape
Ranger School
Mountain Survival Course/Mountain Leader Course
Jumpmaster
Army Reconnaissance and Surveillance Leaders Course
Army Combat Diver Qualification Course
Military Free-Fall Parachutist Course

Organization
According to a 2001 field manual, there is one SIGINT section with six SOT-A per each Special Forces Group. A SOT-A team consists of four members.

References

United States Army Special Operations Command